T. Alan Morgan (born February 8, 1988) is an American politician. He is a member of the South Carolina House of Representatives from the 18th District. He was elected in a special election on May 24th, 2022 and was sworn in on June 15th, 2022. He was re-elected to office on November 8th, 2022. He is a member of the Republican party. Alan Morgan is the brother of Adam Morgan, who also serves in the South Carolina State House from the 20th District.

Morgan is a member of the South Carolina Freedom Caucus.  He also serves on the House Agriculture, Natural Resources & Environmental Affairs Committee.

References

Living people
1988 births
Republican Party members of the South Carolina House of Representatives
21st-century American politicians